The Chama Cha Uzalendo (CCU) is a Kenyan political party established in 2004. The party is currently headed by Maur Bwanamaka. Former party chairmen include Wavinya Ndeti and Koigi Wamwere.

2007 general election
Wavinya Ndeti was elected to Parliament as the first woman to ever represent the Kathiani constituency. Gitobu Imanyara was elected to represent the Central Imenti constituency.

2017 general election
Ahead of the 2017 election, CCU joined the Coalition for Reforms and Democracy (CORD) in July 2016; in 2017, most CORD members transitioned into the National Super Alliance coalition. David Mwalika Mboni was elected to represent Kitui County, the sole CCU member to have a seat in the National Assembly.

2021 Machakos Senate race
After CCU senator Boniface Kabaka's death in December 2020, the Senate seat for Machakos County became available. CCU candidate Lily Nduku Mwanzia withdrew from the race due to financial constraints.

References
                   

2004 establishments in Kenya
Political parties established in 2004
Political parties in Kenya